The President (German: Der Präsident) is a 1928 German silent drama film directed by Gennaro Righelli and starring Ivan Mozzhukhin, Nikolai Malikoff and Suzy Vernon. It was shot at the Staaken and EFA Studios in Berlin as well as on location in Nice on the French Riviera. The film's sets were designed by the art director Robert Neppach. It was distributed by the German branch of Universal Pictures.

Cast
 Ivan Mozzhukhin as Chico / Pepe Torre, ein Bauer 
 Nikolai Malikoff as Conde de Valdez  
 Suzy Vernon as Donna Manuela, seine Tochter  
 Luigi Serventi as Don Germo / Geronimo Cortez  
 Heinrich Schroth as Deon Ramirez, ein Politiker  
 Iwa Wanja as Jenetz / Juez, ein Bauernmädchen  
 Rolf as The dog Mingo

References

Bibliography
 Goble, Alan. The Complete Index to Literary Sources in Film. Walter de Gruyter, 1999.

External links

1928 films
Films of the Weimar Republic
German silent feature films
Films directed by Gennaro Righelli
German comedy-drama films
Films set in South America
Films based on German novels
Films with screenplays by Franz Schulz
German black-and-white films
1928 comedy-drama films
Silent comedy-drama films
Films shot at Halensee Studios
Films shot at Staaken Studios
Films shot in Nice
1920s German films